Martin Islet is a small island lying just off Red Point, Port Kembla in New South Wales, Australia.

William Martin 

The Five Islands, of which Martin Islet is one, were named Martins Isles by Matthew Flinders and George Bass after Bass's navy servant William Martin.  Martin was part of their three-man  crew when they anchored by the island on 25 March 1796 in the Tom Thumb, having been swept a long way off-course on their way to Port Hacking.

Little is known of Martin's life.  He was baptised on 4 March 1781 at Dartford.  In 1794 aged 13 he was employed by the navy as a loblolly boy, meaning personal servant, to Bass who was the surgeon on board HMS Reliance for her voyage to Australia.  Martin was still with Bass in 1799 at age 18 when Bass left the navy, but at that point record of him ends.

References 

Islands of New South Wales